The following are the winners of the 9th annual (1982) Origins Award, presented at Origins 1983:

Charles Roberts Awards

The H.G. Wells Awards

External links
 1982 Origins Awards Winners

1982 awards
1982 awards in the United States
Origins Award winners